The Kids From C.A.P.E.R. is an American comedy television series that aired on NBC from September 11 to November 20, 1976, and reran from April 9 to September 3, 1977. All 13 episodes of the series were produced and directed by Stanley Z. Cherry; among the executive producers was Don Kirshner. Both Cherry and Kirshner had previously worked on The Monkees, Cherry having written the episode "Some Like It Lukewarm" in 1968, while Kirshner was the original musical supervisor for The Monkees until early 1967.

Although the show has not been released on video, there is an LP of most of the songs from the series, omitting "Baby Blue", "You're Under My Spell" and the show's theme. The LP was released by Kirshner Records and Tapes in 1977.  One of the songs from the series, "When It Hit Me (The Hurricane Song)" was released as a single; the song was also recorded by Rob Hegel (who co-wrote the song) for his 1980 RCA album.  Two other album tracks, "Tit for Tat" and "Baby Blue", had both been co-written and previously released by Neil Sedaka on his 1975 album Hungry Years.

Overview
The "Kids from C.A.P.E.R." (the Civilian Authority for the Protection of Everybody, Regardless) were a team of four teenage boys headquartered in the 927th Police Precinct in the fictitious city of "Northeast Southweston"; together they helped the police to solve unusual cases. The CAPERs communicated using "Caperband" Radios (walkie-talkies with a prominent "C" on them -- actually modified Star Trek Communicators made by the Mego Corporation in 1974).

The group often traveled around Northeast Southweston in the "Big Bologna", a one-time hot dog van converted into a mobile crime lab, while retaining the giant hot dog on the roof.

Each episode began with a silent comedy vignette, with a cast member in voiceover giving the "Secret Word", which was usually key to that episode's plot. At the end of each episode, another silent vignette would appear in which a "Caper Code" would be given in voice over; a series of letters and numbers such as "P3 E8 R19 C2" (TIME), the code for the next episode's "secret word".  Each episode featured a song which was performed in a short and a long form at different points in the episode.

Episodes would open with a narration by P.T., shortly followed by a visit from the week's girl guest star seeking their help.

One of many recurring gags was the explanation of what the acronym C.A.P.E.R. stood for: when asked, the team would quickly stand at attention and reply in unison, "The Civilian Authority for the Protection of Everybody, Regardless!" followed by a four-part harmonization of "Ta-da", reminiscent of The Three Stooges' harmonized "Hello".

Characters
P.T. (played by Steve Bonino): "Cool and clever", per to the title song's lyrics, He often broke the fourth wall to narrate, and had a variety of skills and talents including a superhuman sense of smell (he called his nose "Seymour").
Bugs (Cosie Costa): "Tough and feisty", he had superhuman strength and speed which he could summon only by looking at his hands.  He was vulnerable to the word "bananas", which could inexplicably send him into a comical and debilitating fit. 
Doomsday (Biff Warren): "All full of sunshine", in contrast to his almost ninja-like black clothing, his talent was communicating with animals, and much of his conversation was about food.  
Doc (John Lansing):  With "the looks, and the brains to catch the crooks", Doc was the scientist of the team, as well as the most expensively dressed.

Supporting Characters
Sergeant Vinton (Robert Emhardt), a policeman at the 927th who appeared to have a consultative or advisory role.
Kurt Klinsinger (Robert Lussier), a comically irresolute TV reporter who persistently pursued them in hopes of getting an exclusive.
Mr. Featherstone, a shark puppet who lived a fishtank in their headquarters and also had a tank inside the Big Bologna, with no indication of how he moved between them.  He possessed a navigational sense when riding in the Big Bologna, but also spoke in unintelligible gibberish which a cast member would usually translate for the benefit of the guest star and audience.

Production Information 

At the start of the 1976-77 television season, The Kids from C.A.P.E.R. was part of a three-hour block of six live action shows that aired Saturday Morning on NBC, alongside Land of the Lost, which was entering its third season, and four other new shows: Monster Squad; McDuff, the Talking Dog; Big John, Little John; and Muggsy. NBC shook up this lineup in late November, cancelling McDuff and putting The Kids from C.A.P.E.R. on hiatus. The Kids from C.A.P.E.R. returned on April 9, 1977, and replaced the cancelled Muggsy in the lineup. Neither C.A.P.E.R. nor any of the other three remaining shows returned to the NBC lineup for the beginning of the 1977-78 television season.

The pilot episode was refactored into a flashback episode in the full series: "Mummy's the Word", presumably to account for the changes in costume and set decoration. These changes are alluded to by lines of dialogue in the newer wrapper material episode, such as "Don't you remember the good old days, when the Big Bologna was blue?" and "Boy, you guys sure dressed funny in those days." The latter is said by Doomsday, the only character to retain his costume from the pilot.

The title sequence was reworked for the 1977 run to incorporate visuals from actual episodes; these were not present for the first run in 1976. The result is that the later titles are paced more in keeping with the theme music and contain more visual interest.

Episodes

References

External links
 
 http://www.toonarific.com/show.php?show_id=6752
 http://www.70slivekidvid.com/kids.htm
 http://www.kidsfromcaper.com

1970s American satirical television series
1970s American sitcoms
1976 American television series debuts
1977 American television series endings
American teen sitcoms
American television shows featuring puppetry
English-language television shows
Espionage television series
NBC original programming
Television series about teenagers
Television series by Alan Landsburg Productions